The 2016 UEFA Women's Champions League Final was the final match of the 2015–16 UEFA Women's Champions League, the 15th season of Europe's premier women's club football tournament organised by UEFA, and the seventh season since it was renamed from the UEFA Women's Cup to the UEFA Women's Champions League. It was played at the Mapei Stadium – Città del Tricolore stadium in Reggio Emilia, Italy, on 26 May 2016, between German team Wolfsburg and French team Lyon.

Lyon defeated Wolfsburg 4–3 on penalties (1–1 after extra time) to win their third European title.

Background

The final was a rematch of the 2013 final, won by Wolfsburg 1–0. This was the ninth successive final with at least one German team, and the sixth final in seven years between a French team and a German team.

Both teams had won the tournament twice. Wolfsburg won successive finals in 2013 and 2014, while Lyon reached four successive finals, winning in 2011 and 2012, but losing in 2010 and 2013, all facing German opponents.

Road to the final

Note: In all results below, the score of the finalist is given first (H: home; A: away).

Match

Officials
Hungarian referee Katalin Kulcsár was announced as the final referee by UEFA on 10 May 2016.

Details
The "home" team (for administrative purposes) was determined by an additional draw held after the quarter-final and semi-final draws, which was held on 27 November 2015 at UEFA headquarters in Nyon, Switzerland.

Statistics

See also
2016 UEFA Champions League Final

References

External links
2015–16 UEFA Women's Champions League
2016 final: Reggio Emilia

2016
Final
Champions League Final
Uefa Women's Champions League Final 2016
Reggio Emilia
Champions League Final
Champions League Final
European Cup Women's Final 2016
Olympique Lyonnais Féminin matches
VfL Wolfsburg (women) matches